ADOS may refer to:

Computer operating systems
Atari DOS, an 8-bit disk operating system used in Atari computers
Arabic MS-DOS, from Microsoft
Advanced DOS, a project name for IBM and Microsoft's OS/2 1.0
Access DOS, assistive software shipped with Microsoft's MS-DOS 6.2x
ADOS (Russian operating system) (or АДОС), ca. 1989

Other uses
Autism Diagnostic Observation Schedule, a diagnostic test
 American Descendants of Slavery, a descriptive term and political movement
A Dream of Spring, a forthcoming novel in the A Song of Ice and Fire book series

See also 
AOS (disambiguation)
DOS (disambiguation)